22nd of May (Flemish Tweeëntwintig mei) is a 2010 Belgian thriller film directed and written by Koen Mortier. The film stars Sam Louwyck, Barbara Callewaert, and Titus De Voogdt. The film won one award and was nominated for five with all awards going to Koen Mortier.

Premise
The film follows the aftermath of an explosion at a shopping mall. Sam, a security guard, attempts to save the victims, but is mistaken for the perpetrator of the attack.

Cast
Sam Louwyck ... Sam
Titus De Voogdt ... Nico Degeest
Wim Willaert ... Wim
Norman Baert ... Norman
Barbara Callewaert ...  Sandra Lauwaert

Awards

Won
Mexico International Film Festival 2011:
Golden Palm Award - Feature Film: Koen Mortier
Leeds International Film Festival 2011:
Golden Owl Award

Nominated
Toronto International Film Festival 2010:
Visions Award - Koen Mortier
Cinequest San Jose Film Festival 2011:
New Vision Award - Global Landscapes Competition: Koen Mortier
Hong Kong International Film Festival 2011:
Silver DV Award - Global Vision Competition: Koen Mortier
Rotterdam International Film Festival 2011:
Tiger Award - Koen Mortier
Seattle International Film Festival 2011:
New Director's Showcase Award - Contemporary World Cinema: Koen Mortier
Magritte Awards 2012:
Best Flemish Film in Coproduction

References

External links
 

2010 films
Belgian thriller drama films
2010s Dutch-language films
2010 thriller drama films
2010 fantasy films
Belgian avant-garde and experimental films
Films set in Belgium
Belgium in fiction
2010 drama films